Viktor Romanenkov (born 29 September 1993 in Tallinn) is an Estonian figure skater. He is the 2008–14 Estonian national champion and competed at the 2014 Winter Olympics. He then signed a six-month contract to perform on a cruise ship. He is the son of Oksana Romanenkova (née Hutornaja), a figure skating coach and a five-time Estonian national ladies' champion.

Programs

Competitive highlights 
JGP: Junior Grand Prix

References

External links 

 
 Viktor Romanenkov at Tracings.net

Estonian male single skaters
1993 births
Living people
Figure skaters from Tallinn
Figure skaters at the 2014 Winter Olympics
Olympic figure skaters of Estonia
Estonian people of Russian descent
Competitors at the 2013 Winter Universiade